East Grafton may refer to:

 East Grafton, New Hampshire, in the United States
 East Grafton, Wiltshire, in England

See also
 Grafton, New York, which contains the hamlet of East Grafton
 Knights Landing, California, formerly Baltimore and East Grafton